Henry Armitt Brown (December 1, 1844 – August 21, 1878) was an American author and orator.

Life
Brown was born in Philadelphia, December 1, 1844, the second son of Frederick and Charlotte A. (Hoppin) Brown.  Brown is a lineal descendant of William Clayton, the acting Governor of the Pennsylvania Colony.

He graduated from Yale College in 1865.  He spent a year after graduating at the Columbia College Law School, New York City.  After travels abroad, he resumed the study of the law in the office of Daniel Dougherty, Esq., of Philadelphia, and was admitted to the bar of that city in December, 1869. He was attracted to literature, and in spite of success in his profession, he made little effort to increase his practice. He wrote extensively for current periodicals, and began to be widely known as a public speaker. An oration delivered in Philadelphia on the 100th anniversary of the assembling of the Continental Congress of 1774 was followed by a succession of public addresses, especially in connection with the centennial celebrations of revolutionary events. It was after a long day at Valley Forge, on June 19, 1878, where he had delivered an oration, that he returned to Philadelphia to complete his preparation for a similar engagement at Monmouth.  His illness gradually developed into typhoid fever. About the first of August he rallied, and seemed likely to recover; but successive relapses ensued, and he died on the 21st of that month at the age of 34.

He was married, Dec. 7, 1871, to Miss Josephine L., daughter of Mr. John Baker, of Philadelphia, who survived him with his only child, a daughter Anna Robeson Brown. Another daughter, Henrietta Armitt Brown, was born posthumously, a week after Brown's death.

He was elected as a member to the American Philosophical Society in 1877.

A public elementary school in Philadelphia is named after him.

References

1844 births
1878 deaths
Writers from Philadelphia
Yale College alumni
Columbia Law School alumni
Pennsylvania lawyers
American male writers
Deaths from typhoid fever
19th-century American lawyers